Calamity Jane (A Musical Western) is a stage musical based on the historical figure of frontierswoman Calamity Jane. The non-historical, somewhat farcical plot involves the authentic Calamity Jane's professional associate Wild Bill Hickok, and presents the two as having a contentious relationship that ultimately proves to be a facade for mutually amorous feelings. The Calamity Jane stage musical was an adaption of a 1953 Warner Bros. musical film of  the same name that starred Doris Day. First produced in 1961, the stage musical Calamity Jane features six songs not heard in the film. According to Jodie Prenger, star of the Calamity Jane 2014–15 UK tour, the songs added for the stage musical had been written for but not included in the Calamity Jane film ("Love You Dearly" had been used in the 1954 Doris Day musical film Lucky Me).

Credits
Adapted by Ronald Hanmer and Phil Park from the stage play by Charles K. Freeman, after the Warner Bros. film, written by James O'Hanlon

Songs by Paul Francis Webster (lyrics) and Sammy Fain (music)

Synopsis
Deadwood City's two most famous peace officers, Calamity Jane and Wild Bill Hickok, get involved in saving the neck of Henry Miller, the local saloon operator. It seems that "Millie" has been promoting a beautiful actress named Frances Fryer, but Frances turns out to be a male, Francis. Millie's attempt to cover up is soon unmasked by the angry miners, and only Calamity can cool the crowd with her trusty pistols. To keep the peace, Calamity sets out for Chicago to bring back the miner's real heart-throb, Adelaide Adams. In Chicago Calamity mistakes Adelaide's maid, Katie Brown, for the actress and hauls her back to Deadwood. Onstage Katie is greeted warmly, but breaks down and confesses that she is not the famous star. Calamity once more has to restore order and persuades the audience to give Katie a chance. They do, and she wins the heart of every male in town including Calamity's dashing love hope, Lt. Danny Gilmartin. Calamity reluctantly overcomes her jealousy over losing Danny and discovers her true love for Wild Bill.

Musical numbers
Source: Concord Theatricals

Act I
 "The Deadwood Stage (Whip-Crack-Away!)" - Calamity, Bill, Miller, and Company
 "Adelaid" † - Bill and Men
 "Everyone Complains About the Weather" † - Fryer
 "Men!" † - Calamity
 "Careless with the Truth" † - Calamity, Bill, and Men
 "A Hive Full of Honey" - Fryer
 "I Can Do Without You" - Calamity and Bill
 "'Tis Harry I'm Plannin' to Marry" - Adelaid, Boys, and Girls
 "'Tis Harry I'm Plannin' to Marry" (Reprise 1) - Katie
 "Just Blew in from the Windy City" - Calamity and Men
 "Keep It Under Your Hat" - Katie

Act II
 "Higher Than a Hawk" - Bill
 "A Woman's Touch" - Calamity and Katie
 "Love You Dearly" (from Lucky Me) † - Katie and Danny
 "The Black Hills of Dakota" - Company
 "'Tis Harry I'm Plannin' to Marry" (Reprise 2) † - Katie
 "Secret Love" - Calamity
 "Finale" - Company

† Not included in the original film (1953)

Production history

In the US
The world premiere production of the stage musical version of Calamity Jane ran 27 May - 17 June 1961 at the Casa Mañana in Fort Worth TX: Casa Mañana stock actress Betty O'Neill led this production, touted as "the first try-out of a musical ever staged outside the East or in-the round."

The play then ran from 21 June - 18 July 1961 at the Muny in St Louis with Edie Adams in the title role while Allyn Ann McLerie played Katie - a role she had originated in the 1953 film Calamity Jane - and George Gaynes - McLerie's husband - starred as Wild Bill Hickok. The role of Danny Gilmartin was played by Nolan Van Way.

On 3 – 8 July 1961 the Pittsburgh CLO (Civic Light Opera) production of Calamity Jane with Martha Raye in the title role played the Civic Arena (Pittsburgh): this production featured George Gaynes as Wild Bill and Allyn Ann McLerie, Gaynes and McLerie transferring from the Muny production to that of the Pittsburgh CLO for the duration of the latter's engagement.

Carol Burnett played the title role in a Starlight Theatre (Kansas City MO) production of Calamity Jane that ran 17 – 30 July 1961. On Burnett's signing an exclusive contract with CBS-TV in the summer of 1962, the network announced that she would headline a televised broadcast of Calamity Jane over the 1962-3 television season. Burnett's Calamity Jane special in fact did not air until the autumn of 1963 after taping that summer. This schedule let Burnett reprise the title role onstage in a State Fair Music Theater (Dallas) production whose two-week run commenced 24 June 1963. (The Pittsburgh CLO had been invited to host Burnett's 1963 live engagement headlining Calamity Jane: however the CLO could not meet the budget). On 10 July 1963 Burnett and her castmates from the Dallas stage production - including Art Lund as Wild Bill - performed Calamity Jane at CBS Studio 50 (NYC), with the play performed non-stop three times before a live audience: CBS-TV taped all three run-throughs, one of which was broadcast as Burnett's debut television special 12 November 1963.

Betty Hutton see Extra Info was scheduled to lead a 1962 summer stock production of Calamity Jane but canceled beforehand due to a protracted pregnancy, and was replaced by Ginger Rogers.  see Extra Info Rogers verifiably headlined three engagements of this production: at the Melody Fair in North Tonawanda NY 19–24 June 1962, the Carousel Theater in Framingham MA 2–8 July 1962 , and the Oakdale Theatre in Wallingford CT 25–28 July 1962. The same production also played at WMT (Warwick Musical Theatre, Rhode Island) 9–14 July 1962 but Rogers' own participation is not verifiable. (An early credit of Jim Bailey, who'd become a star female impersonator, was as an ensemble member in this tour of Calamity Jane.) 

At the time of the premiere of the stage musical of Calamity Jane, Warner Bros. was considering mounting a Broadway production of the play, but US performances of the stage musical of Calamity Jane have remained essentially confined to the repertory and amateur theater scene. A Broadway production announced in 2005, using a revised book by Randy Skinner, who would also direct and choreograph, failed to materialize—though the prospective production held readings in New York City with C&W singer Louise Mandrell as Calamity Jane and veteran musical actor Brent Barrett as Wild Bill (Barrett had played Frank Butler opposite Reba McEntire in Annie Get Your Gun at the Marquis in 2001). Louise Mandrell eventually headlined a repertory production of Calamity Jane by the Good Company Players, featuring Dan and Emily Pessano, Teddy Maldonado, Brian Pecheau, Tami Cowger,  and Jacob Carrillo. The  production ran 19 July - 16 September 2012 at Roger Rocka's Dinner Theater in Fresno. Mandrell has since reprised the role in one-off performances of Calamity Jane firstly on 11 September at the Folly Theater in Kansas City MO as an event in the Arts Midwest 2015 Conference, and subsequently on 11 October 2015 at the CMA Theatre as an event in the International Entertainment Buyers Association 2015 Conference. Mandrell is scheduled to again star as Calamity Jane when the Good Company Players remount the musical in the summer of 2019.

On 29 January 2018 two evening performances of what is billed as a concert presentation of Calamity Jane are scheduled for Manhattan supper club Feinstein's/54 Below: the announced performers are Sara Jean Ford as Calamity Jane, Jenn Gambatese as Adelaid Adams, Christopher Gurr as a narrator, Tyler Hanes as Danny Gilmartin, Kara Lindsay as Katie Brown, Michael Park as Henry Miller, Tally Sessions as Wild Bill, and Brandon Uranowitz as Francis Freyer. Also Calamity Jane is scheduled to make its New York City area debut as a full production in a 13–25 March 2018 engagement at the Lion Theatre an off-off-Broadway venue in the Theatre Row complex in Manhattan.

In the UK
The stage musical version of Calamity Jane has enjoyed a prolific professional production history in the UK, a Sheffield Crucible production which previewed 27 July 1974 and opened 28 July 1974 being billed as "the British professional premiere of 'Calamity Jane'". The Crucible production's title role was played by future screenwriter/ novelist Lynda La Plante billed as Lynda Marchal, and LaPlante/ Marchal reprised the role in a 1974 engagement at the Belgrade Theatre (Coventry) that also featured Brenda Blethyn and - as an ensemble member - Graham Cole.

In 1979, Barbara Windsor headlined the first UK tour of Calamity Jane. After its premiere engagement at the Billingham Forum, which opened 27 August 1979, this production toured for twelve weeks to conclude with a November 1979 date at the Sunderland Empire. Windsor's co-star as Wild Bill was Eric Flynn, and Norman Vaughan was featured as Francis Fryer: at the tour's premiere engagement in Billingham the role of Henry Miller was played by Jeffrey Holland filling in for the ailing Dudley Owen who evidently played out the remaining engagements. Toyah Willcox, while promoting her own headlining Calamity Jane tour in 2002, told Terry Grimley of the Birmingham Post: "Barbara Windsor did this show twenty years ago and it was due to go into the West End, but there were some problems with her private life." The touring production of Calamity Jane with Barbara Windsor did occasion the musical's London-area premiere, as the production played the Ashcroft Theatre (Croydon) 18–29 September 1979.

Louise Gold starred in a production of Calamity Jane at the Leicester Haymarket 22 November 1994 - 28 January 1995 with Ricco Ross as Wild Bill, while the play's premiere central London production played 9 December 1994 - 21 January 1995 at the Battersea Arts Centre, with Leigh McDonald in the title role.

Gemma Craven starred in a production of Calamity Jane at Sadler's Wells 21 May - 15 June 1996  as the seventh engagement of an eleven engagement national tour that launched with a 29 February - 16 March 1996 Belgrade Theatre engagement. Stephen McGann played Wild Bill and Stuart Pendred was Danny Gilmartin in this production. Its final engagement was in Newcastle.

{| class="wikitable floatright collapsible collapsed"
|-
! Excerpted review Shaftesbury Theatre performance July 2003
|-
| style="text-align:center;"|Please note: Abridgements are shown in italics
|-
| "This hyperactive, 'Annie Get Your Gun'-type Wild West songfest stars Toyah Willcox...who fairly batters you into admiring her irredeemably perky performance : she's constantly moving, singing, dances like an irritating leprechaun, & expends more energy in one evening than I have in the past twenty years"; "Under the steady hand of director Ed Curtis, the young & inexperienced cast members (many making their professional debuts here) are well drilled. Craig Revel Horwood'''s choreography, though at first sub-Agnes de Mille, blossoms outwards to remind the audience of what was so special about his work for 'My One and Only'"; The simple wooden sets are more than serviceable, & James Whiteside's lighting is suitably lurid for the Black Hills of Dakota"; "The memorable score by Sammy Fain...helps to overcome the feeling that this cheerful, hard-working production does not really belong on the West End stage." - Sheridan Morley (New Statesman) 
|}

In 2002 and 2003 Toyah Willcox led a production of Calamity Jane that toured throughout Great Britain with the first leg of the tour playing nine cities, the inaugural engagement being at the Derngate Theatre (Northampton) 9 – 14 September 2002 with the ninth venue played being the Alexandra Theatre (Birmingham) whose engagement ran 11 – 16 November 2002. The second leg of the Calamity Jane tour led by Willcox had an inaugural 20–25 January 2003 engagement at the King's Theatre (Glasgow) then played fifteen subsequent engagements to conclude with a 26 June - 20 September 2003 engagement  - previewed from 12 June 2003 - at the Shaftesbury Theatre in Holborn, it having been announced in April 2003 that this production of Calamity Jane would have a limited-run summer engagement at the Shaftesbury thus marking the West End debut of any production of the Calamity Jane stage musical. Interviewed at the time of the opening of Calamity Jane at the Shaftesbury, Toyah Willcox stated: "We've kind of revamped it so it's more 'West End' and we've put big dance numbers in. We've added a bit more b******t to it!" although she maintained: "Our production is not saccharine sweet, it's really very ballsy. There are no sequins in our production whatsoever!" corroborating statements she'd made earlier in the tour's run as "This isn't a sequinned production. We've tried to make it gritty."

Thom Southerland directed an off-West End revival of Calamity Jane at Upstairs at the Gatehouse 8 June 8–3 July 2010: Phyllida Crowley Smith choreographed this production, which featured Katherine Eames in the title role.

 

Jodie Prenger starred in a production of Calamity Jane whose 17 July - 6 September 2014 engagement at the Watermill Theatre (Berks) inaugurated a national tour of intended six months duration: however interest in booking this production was sufficiently high as to allow for its playing constant engagements for more than twelve months, with venues played throughout Great Britain - plus a 19 – 23 May 2015 engagement at Bord Gáis Energy Theatre, Dublin - with two London-area engagements: 17–21 March 2015 at the New Wimbledon Theatre and - as the tour's final engagement - 4 – 8 August 2015 at the Richmond Theatre. This production of Calamity Jane - which co-starred Tom Lister as Wild Bill -  - had its 1 July 2015 matinée performance at the Curve (Leicester) recorded as a 360-degree video made available for complementary online viewing 22–24 July 2015.

The earliest known theatrical credit of star mezzo-soprano Katherine Jenkins was in a school production of Calamity Jane at Dwr-y-Felin Comprehensive when she was a student there circa 1994, Jenkins playing the role of Katie.

In Australia

Neglected Musicals presented a staged reading of Calamity Jane from 3 August 2016 for six presentations: playing at the Hayes Theater in Potts Point and starring Virginia Gay. This was Calamity Janes professional debut in Australia although the play has a long production history via Australian amateur troupes, having been mounted as early as 1965 by the then-amateur Brisbane Repertory with future television star Rowena Wallace in the title role: it was during the Brisbane Repertory production's 20 – 29 May 1965 run Wallace was discovered by actor Barry Creyton.

Recordings
There is a complete recording of the entire score of Calamity Jane available, recorded for JAY Records in 1995: it includes Debbie Shapiro as Calamity Jane with Jason Howard, Tim Flavin and Susannah Fellows. A "cast album" of the 1996 production of Calamity Jane starring Gemma Craven - who is in fact the sole vocalist on the album - was issued in 1996.

References

Further reading
Vocal score: Calamity Jane (Operetta in Two Acts) Amateur Operatic Version Warner Chappell Music Ltd (Copyright 2006 by Faber Music Ltd )
Libretto: Calamity Jane A Musical Western'' adapted by Ronald Hanmer & Phil Park from the stage play by Charles K. Freeman after the Warner Bros Film written by James O'Hanlon. Licensed to Josef Weinberger Ltd, London, by arrangement with Tams-Witmark Music Library NYC. (Copyright 1962 by Tams-Witmark Music Library, New York.)

External links
 (1963 TV musical starring Carol Burnett) 
Calamity Jane (1963 TV production starring Carol Burnett) on YouTube

1961 musicals
1963 in American television
1963 television specials
1960s American television specials
Musical television films
Musical television specials
Cultural depictions of Calamity Jane
Cultural depictions of Wild Bill Hickok
Plays set in South Dakota